Clyde may refer to the following places in the U.S. state of Wisconsin:
Clyde, Wisconsin, a town in Iowa County
Clyde (community), Iowa County, Wisconsin, an unincorporated community
Clyde, Kewaunee County, Wisconsin, an unincorporated community